Group A of the 1995 Fed Cup Americas Zone Group I was one of two pools in the Americas Zone Group I of the 1995 Fed Cup. Four teams competed in a round robin competition, with the top two teams advancing to the knockout stage and the bottom team being relegated down to Group II for 1996.

Mexico vs. Colombia

Venezuela vs. Peru

Mexico vs. Peru

Colombia vs. Venezuela

Mexico vs. Venezuela

Colombia vs. Peru

  placed last in the pool, and thus was relegated to Group II in 1996, where they placed first in their pool of seven and as such advanced back to Group I for 1997.

See also
Fed Cup structure

References

External links
 Fed Cup website

1995 Fed Cup Americas Zone